Stokey is a surname. Notable people with the surname include:

Mike Stokey (1918–2003), American game show host and producer
Nancy Stokey (born 1950), American economist

See also
Stoke Newington
Stoker (surname)